Chaetocrea is a genus in the Tubeufiaceae family of fungi. This is a monotypic genus, containing the single species Chaetocrea parasitica.

References

External links
Chaetocrea at Index Fungorum

Tubeufiaceae
Monotypic Dothideomycetes genera